Senegalia caffra, also known as hook-thorn or Acacia caffra, is a tree that occurs commonly in southern Africa. Though it is cultivated, it often occurs naturally in Gauteng suburban gardens, together with Acacia karroo and Acacia robusta.

Description 
It has extremely hard, dense and attractive timber, and is only spared from intense exploitation because of its strongly twisted trunk which does not lend itself to long planks, and its tendency to develop heart rot. The bark is rough, dark grey and flaking, while the strong, paired hooked thorns are a formidable deterrent on young plants. Twigs which may vary in hairiness from densely puberulous to pubescent or tomentose. Due to its variability the species has been described under many names, some being listed below.

Senegalia caffra is deciduous and older plants are resistant to frost, fire and drought. Its appearance may be confused with that of Senegalia ataxacantha or with Senegalia hereroensis, though the former has scattered prickles and the latter has more robust prickles. Together with Dombeya rotundifolia and Erythrina lysistemon, this species is one of the earliest to flower in spring, producing strongly scented flower spikes.

Distribution 
It occurs in the Transvaal, Eswatini, KwaZulu-Natal, Cape Province and the southern regions of Botswana, Zimbabwe and Mozambique. Senegalia caffra was also observed, in 1957, by French researchers in the current Central African Republic.

Uses 
Parts of the tree are used by the Bantu in traditional herbal medicine for curing a large range of complaints.

Chemistry
In common with other Acacias and Senegalias, the bark and leaves are rich in tannins such as proteracacinidin.

Gallery

See also
List of Southern African indigenous trees and woody lianes

References

External links

caffra